Aleksandar Kitinov (born 13 January 1971) is a retired Macedonian professional tennis player.  Kitinov turned pro in 1992 and retired in 2003.  A doubles specialist, he won three titles during his career on the ATP Tour and reached a career-high ranking of No. 38 in November 1999.

ATP Tour finals

Doubles (3 titles – 4 runners-up)

External links
 
 
 

1971 births
Living people
Macedonian male tennis players
Yugoslav male tennis players
Sportspeople from Skopje